Catocala ella is a moth in the family Erebidae first described by Arthur Gardiner Butler in 1877. It is found in south-eastern Siberia and Japan.

References

ella
Moths described in 1877
Moths of Asia
Taxa named by Arthur Gardiner Butler